Aleksey Fyodorovich Adashev (died 1561) was a Russian statesman, okolnichy, voivode of Livonia. He was a confidant of Tsar Ivan the Terrible, but fell out of favor and was imprisoned in Yuryev (now Tartu) in 1560, where he died.

References

Year of birth missing
1561 deaths
Tsardom of Russia people